Oz Karahan is a Cypriot political activist, columnist and current president of the Union of Cypriots.

Life and political career
Born in 1990, Oz Karahan spent his youth in Famagusta before moving back to Larnaca where part of his family originates from. He graduated from Famagusta Namık Kemal High School. From a very young age, he joined and led a youth organization called Linobambaki, which was an active organisation during the 2011 Turkish Cypriot protests against Turkey.

After completing his university studies in Anglo-American University, he became politically active in the United States, Sweden and Germany. During this time, was a member of the Communist Party USA in United States, as well as a member of the Communist Party in Sweden.

He was one of the founders of the World Union of Turkish-speaking Cypriots (WUTC), which fought against the Turkish occupation and the social and cultural oppression that Turkish-speaking Cypriots face in the occupied areas of Cyprus because of Turkey.

In 2019, he was an MEP candidate from the Jasmine Movement in the European Parliament elections. He writes in his column “Gavur Imam” for the Avrupa newspaper.

References

1990 births
Living people
Cypriot politicians
Cypriot activists
Cypriot political writers
Cypriot nationalists
People from Famagusta
People from Larnaca